The Toyota TF104 was a Formula One car used by the Toyota F1 team during the 2004 Formula One season.

The car was the third and final Gustav Brunner and René Hilhorst designed Toyota in Formula One, and it was considered as another "evolutionary step" up from its predecessor the TF103, which in turn had been labelled a "evolutionary step" up from the TF102 used in 2002. Luca Marmorini continued to lead the engine design. 

The car was initially driven by the same pairing as in 2003; Olivier Panis and Cristiano da Matta. However, by the time the season came to a conclusion, both drivers had been replaced by Italy's Jarno Trulli and the team's Brazilian ex-test driver Ricardo Zonta respectively.

Development

Development on the car had begun in earnest, some ten months prior to its unveiling. Upon launch, designer Gustav Brunner said; "The TF103 was a highly competitive package. Unfortunately, we couldn't get all of the performance out of it. Theoretically, the TF104 is an evolutionary step up from the TF103, but in fact, the TF104 shares not a single part that we used with the TF103. We improved every single inch of the chassis, and redesigned every important internal component. We achieved a great leap ahead aerodynamically, made the car lighter overall, and increased the rigidity of the chassis".

This continued approach was deemed to be too unambitious by many critics and this was confirmed by the overall performance of the car. Ultimately, this led to Brunner's dismissal midway through the season and it was the  former Jordan and Renault Technical Director Mike Gascoyne who came in to replace him.

Known for his ability to assess weaknesses, and re-invigorate a team, Gascoyne started work immediately on revising the TF104.

TF104B

The resulting TF104B chassis couldn't be considered revolutionary either, but neither was it supposed to be with Gascoyne merely working to try to eradicate some of the initial conceptual flaws in the Brunner design. The revised car was introduced at the German Grand Prix to some positive effect, but rather than continue on that upward trend, Gascoyne ordered the freezing of any further development to concentrate on the upcoming TF105 chassis to be used in the 2005 Formula One season.

Espionage allegation controversy
During the season, the car's similarity to the previous year's championship car, the Ferrari F2003-GA, was so noted that there were accusations of the team of using stolen data files from Scuderia Ferrari. The case was investigated by the district attorney of Cologne, where Toyota F1 is based. Following the allegations, Toyota was reported to have refused to send the data back to Italy because they did not want Ferrari to take advantage of their own data, which had been mixed in with Ferrari's.

Performance

Overall the car and the season was considered to be a disaster, with the team, now in its third season of competition, managing only a second consecutive eighth place Constructors' Championship finish. The ramifications of the car's poor performance were some key departures; technical director Gustav Brunner was fired mid-season and Cristiano da Matta soon followed having been blamed himself for lacklustre performances.

With the arrival of Mike Gascoyne as technical director, alongside the announcements of Jarno Trulli and Ralf Schumacher for 2005, it could be argued that the Toyota F1 operation took on a slightly different feel over the course of the 2004 season.

Complete Formula One results
(key) (results in bold indicate pole position)

 – Driver did not finish the Grand Prix, but was classified as they completed more than 90% of the race distance.

References

External links

TF104 Evolution at Toyota F1 official site
TF104 Facts at f1db.com

Toyota Formula One cars
2004 Formula One season cars
Formula One controversies